The 2015 Formula D season, officially titled the Formula Drift Pro Championship, was the twelfth season of the Formula D series. The season began on April 10 at Long Beach and ended on October 10 at Irwindale Speedway.

Schedule & results

Calendar changes & notes
 Prior to the season, Formula D announced a new multi-year television deal with CBS Sports Network.
 The third round has moved from Homestead-Miami Speedway to Orlando Speed World. This is the first time Formula D has held an event in Orlando.
 Prior to the season, Formula D announced the start of a new international series called the Formula D World Championship starting in 2015. The new series is eligible to drivers that compete in all 7 Pro Championship rounds and 3 international rounds. The three international rounds will be held at the Fuji Speedway in Japan, Autodrome Saint-Eustache in Canada, and a to-be-determined site in China.
 In September 2015, Formula D announced the cancellation of the final World Championship round in China. Irwindale will be the final round the series.

Results and standings

Pro Championship standings
Event winners in bold.

Manufacturer Cup

Tire Cup

References

External links
 

Formula D seasons
Formula D